Euzona is a genus of beetles in the family Cicindelidae. It was formed from the breakup of the Cicindela genus, and just like Cylindera, is in a state of dispute. Scientists do not agree whether the genus should be considered as a subgenus of Cicindela or kept in its current taxonomic rank. The genus contains the following species:

 Euzona aeneodorsis Sloane, 1917
 Euzona albolineata Macleay, 1888
 Euzona aurita Sloane, 1904
 Euzona cyanonota Sumlin, 1997
 Euzona gilesi Sloane, 1914
 Euzona levitetragramma Freitag, 1979
 Euzona tetragramma Boisduval, 1835
 Euzona trivittata Macleay, 1888

References

Cicindelidae